Cleopatra ( Kleopatra; "Glory of the father") in Greek mythology was the name of two Danaides, that means of two of altogether 50 daughters of Danaus, who had born his numerous daughters with different women. Each of the two Cleopatras married – like all their sisters – one of the 50 sons of Danaus’ twin brother Aegyptus. One Cleopatra, whose mother was a hamadryad (Atlantia or Phoebe), married Agenor, and the other Cleopatra, the daughter of the naiad Polyxo, married Hermus. Like all Danaides – except Hypermnestra – both Cleopatras killed their husbands in the wedding night.

Notes

References 
 Samson Eitrem: Kleopatra 5). In: Realencyclopädie der Classischen Altertumswissenschaft, vol XI, 1 (1921), col. 733.

Women in Greek mythology
Danaids